The Lake Tebera rainbowfish (Melanotaenia herbertaxelrodi) is a species of rainbowfish in the subfamily Melanotaeniinae which is endemic to the Lake Tebera basin in Papua New Guinea. The specific name honours the pet-book publisher Herbert R. Axelrod (1927-2017).

References

Melanotaenia
Taxa named by Gerald R. Allen
Freshwater fish of Papua New Guinea
Taxonomy articles created by Polbot
Fish described in 1981